Diomede Carafa (died 1609) was a Roman Catholic prelate who served as Bishop of Tricarico (1605–1609).

Biography
On 17 August 1605, Diomede Carafa was appointed during the papacy of Pope Paul V as Bishop of Tricarico.
On 28 August 1605, he was consecrated bishop by Pietro Aldobrandini, Archbishop of Ravenna, with Paolo Alberi, Archbishop Emeritus of Dubrovnik, and Metello Bichi, Bishop of Sovana,  serving as co-consecrators. 
He served as Bishop of Tricarico until his death on 12 January 1609 in Rome.

References

External links and additional sources
 (for Chronology of Bishops) 
 (for Chronology of Bishops) 

17th-century Italian Roman Catholic bishops
Bishops appointed by Pope Paul V
1609 deaths